Neptis eltringhami is a butterfly in the family Nymphalidae. It is found on São Tomé Island. The species was named by James John Joicey and George Talbot in 1926 after entomologist Harry Eltringham.

References

eltringhami
Endemic fauna of São Tomé Island
Butterflies described in 1926
Butterflies of Africa
Taxa named by James John Joicey
Taxa named by George Talbot (entomologist)